The Confederate Patent Office was the agency of the Confederate States of America charged with issuing patents on inventions. The Chief Clerk during its entire existence was Rufus Randolph Rhodes of Mississippi who resigned his post at the United States Patent Office after the election of Abraham Lincoln.

The Confederate Patent Office is known to have issued 266 patents, and likely it issued some more during the early months of 1865.  Unfortunately, the records it contained were destroyed in a fire.  Very few patent documents issued by the CPO, likely fewer than 10, are known to survive.

The first patent was issued to James H. Van Houten of Savannah, Georgia, on August 1, 1861, for a "breech-loading gun".

One of the more well-known Confederate patents (at least based on the results) was Patent No. 100, granted to John Mercer Brooke for the design of the Confederate ironclad ship Merrimack, more properly known as the CSS Virginia.

Confederate States Patent #60 was granted to Jacob B. and William L. Platt of Augusta, Georgia on January 7, 1862 for "Camp Cots."

External links 

The Confederate Patent Office
A History of the Early Patent Office - Chapter 27, The Confederate Patent Office
List of all known patents issued by the Confederate Patent Office

Patent offices
United States patent law
Patent Office
1862 establishments in the Confederate States of America
1865 disestablishments in the Confederate States of America
Organizations based in Richmond, Virginia